Linum cariense is a species of flowering plant in the family Linaceae which is endemic to Turkey.

Description
Each leaf is tipped by what appears to be a small brown gland. The flowers are typically in clusters of three or more, differentiating the species from the very similar Linum verruciferum which has singular flowers.

References

cariense
Endemic flora of Turkey